Cofi or COFI may refer to:

Organisations 
 Church of Ireland (C of I), Irish province of Anglicanism
 College of Idaho (C of I), Caldwell, Idaho, US
 UN Food and Agriculture Organization's Committee on Fisheries (CoFi)
 Council of Forest Industries, Canada's largest lumber manufacturing group

Other uses 
 a Cofi, someone from Caernarfon, a town in Wales (colloquial demonymic usage)
 Cofi dialect/accent of the Welsh language
 Cost of funds index (COFI), in banking